Joseph "Jos" Van Ingelgem was a Belgian footballer born 23 January 1912 in Jette (Belgium), died 29 May 1989. He was a defender for Daring Club Bruxelles, where he was also picked for Belgium in 1932. He played eleven times for the Diables Rouges, until 1934.

Honours 
 Belgian international from 1932 to 1934 (11 caps)
 Picked for the 1934 World Cup (did not play)
 Champion of Belgium in 1936 and 1937 with Daring Club Bruxelles

References 

Belgium international footballers
Belgian footballers
1934 FIFA World Cup players
1912 births
People from Jette
1989 deaths
Association football defenders
Footballers from Brussels